The Ierul Îngust is a right tributary of the river Ier in Romania. It flows into the Ier near Diosig, close to the Hungarian border.

References

Rivers of Romania
Rivers of Bihor County